Progreso  was a Cuban baseball team in the Cuban League. They first played in the league's second season of 1879, and then again played in the league from 1888 to 1890.

Franchise history
The Progeso club lost all four of its game in the winter of 1879.  It returned to the league for the spring of 1888 season, ending in last place with a 3-12 record. The following year, they tied for last place with Matanzas, as both ended the year 6-14. In the winter of 1889, Progreso finished with a 8-9 record, ending in third place. The 1890 season saw the team place in second place, behind Club Fé.

Among their notable players were Román Calzadilla, Miguel Prats, and Moisés Quintero.

Notes

References

Defunct baseball teams in Cuba
Cuban League teams